Senator Crocker may refer to:

Alvah Crocker (1801–1874), Massachusetts State Senate
George G. Crocker (1843–1913), Massachusetts State Senate